MOTOR Magazine was founded in 1903 by William Randolph Hearst, published by Hearst Corp. What began as a relatively small magazine for wealthy motorists transformed over the years into the leading monthly service and repair publication for shop and technicians.

In 2021, MOTOR Magazine will evolve into a digital publication with an expanded audience base, providing valuable information across the wide variety of automotive industries served by its parent company, MOTOR Information Systems.

MOTOR Magazine is headquartered in Troy, Michigan.

References

External links
 

Automobile magazines published in the United States
Monthly magazines published in the United States
Hearst Communications publications
Magazines established in 1903
Magazines published in Michigan